The World Checkers/Draughts Championship is the tournament of English draughts (also known as "American checkers" or "straight checkers") which determines the world champion. It is organised by the World Checkers/Draughts Federation. The first edition of the men's championship was held in the 1840s, predating the men's Draughts World Championship by several decades. The women's championship has been held since 1986.
There are championships held in two versions. One is 3-Move, where players don't begin their game in the starting position but a position three moves in the game (often drawn randomly from all positions, excluding positions already losing a piece). The other is GAYP (Go as you please), where players start from the very beginning.

Men

Women

See also
List of world championships in mind sports

References

Draughts world championships
Draughts competitions
Recurring sporting events established in 1840